Dionda is the genus of desert minnows, small fish belonging to the family Cyprinidae. They are native to fresh waters in the United States and Mexico. Their range is centered in the Rio Grande basin, but they also occur in associated systems, including Nazas–Aguanaval of north–central Mexico, and Nueces, San Antonio and Colorado of Texas.

They are believed to feed primarily on algae.

Species
There are currently six species in this genus. Additionally, the species now placed in Tampichthys were formerly included in Dionda instead.

 Dionda argentosa Girard, 1856 (Manantial roundnose minnow)
 Dionda diaboli C. Hubbs & W. H. Brown, 1957 (Devils River minnow)
 Dionda episcopa Girard, 1856 (Roundnose minnow)
 Dionda melanops Girard, 1856 (Spotted minnow)
 Dionda nigrotaeniata (Cope, 1880) (Guadalupe roundnose minnow)
 Dionda serena Girard, 1856 (Nueces roundnose minnow)

References